Andy Murray defeated Grigor Dimitrov in the final, 6–4, 7–6(7–2) to win the men's singles tennis title at the 2016 China Open.

Novak Djokovic was the four-time reigning champion, but withdrew with an elbow injury before the tournament.

Seeds

Draw

Finals

Top half

Bottom half

Qualifying

Seeds

Qualifiers

Qualifying draw

First qualifier

Second qualifier

Third qualifier

Fourth qualifier

References

External links
 Main Draw
 Qualifying Draw

2016 China Open (tennis)